Interstate 635 (I-635) is a  partial loop around Dallas, Texas, in the United States between I-20 in Balch Springs and State Highway 121 (SH 121) at the north entrance of the Dallas/Fort Worth International Airport (DFW Airport) in Grapevine. It intersects I-35E at exits 27B and 27C, but does not connect with I-35W. A small part of I-635 and I-20 is collectively designated as the Lyndon B. Johnson Freeway; known locally as the LBJ Freeway, or simply LBJ. The roadway is named after Lyndon B. Johnson, the former US Senator from Texas, 37th Vice President, and the 36th President of the United States. Where I-635 ends at I-20, I-20 continues the LBJ Freeway designation heading west. Since the portion of I-20 between State Highway Spur 408 (Spur 408) to I-635 retains the same names as I-635, the two highways are considered 3/4 of the beltway around Dallas. Together with Spur 408, a portion of State Highway Loop 12 (Loop 12, Walton Walker Freeway), and a portion of I-35E, the Stemmons Freeway, I-635 and I-20 complete the beltway.

Route description

I-635 begins at an intersection with I-20 in southeast Dallas and travels northward through Balch Springs into Mesquite, where it intersects U.S. Highway 80 (US 80) at exits 6A and 6B and I-30 at exits 8A and 8B. The route then turns to the northwest, continuing near the border between Dallas and Garland.  later, it takes a general westward turn as it intersects US 75 at exits 19A and 19B at the High Five Interchange. The section from I-35E to US 75 (Central Expressway) is one of the busiest stretches of road in the Dallas–Fort Worth metroplex, at virtually all hours of the day and night. The route continues west, intersecting the Dallas North Tollway at exit 22B–C and its original terminus, I-35E in Farmers Branch at exits 27B and 27C. The freeway then continues to the northwest, intersecting the President George Bush Turnpike at exit 30 westbound and exit 29B eastbound in Irving before arriving at its final terminus at SH 121 at the north entrance to the DFW Airport.

History

I-635 was originally designated by the Texas Department of Transportation (TxDOT) in 1959 as a loop around the eastside of Dallas, connecting with I-35E to the northwest and southwest sides of the city.

In January 1969, the first section to open to motorists was a  section from US 75 (now SH 310) near Hutchins to Barnes Bridge in Mesquite. In February 1970, the highway from US 75 westward to I-35E northwest of Dallas opened to traffic.

The connecting section of I-20 from the west was not completed until 1978. Initially, the section between I-35E and US 80 in southeast Dallas was concurrent with I-20. When the outlet for I-20 from southeast of Dallas to Terrell was completed, the I-635 designation was removed from I-35E to its intersection with I-20.

On April 1, 1968, Texas State Highway Loop 635 (Loop 635) was designated from I-35E and I-635 to Spur 459 at the north entrance of DFW Airport. Spur 459 became part of a rerouted SH 121 on July 31, 1969. On July 31, 1974, Loop 635 was redesignated as part of I-635, and this section was opened in the 1980s.

Later changes
This interchange carries over 500,000 vehicles per day and was built as the largest interchange in the state of Texas to handle this vehicle load.

Express project
Construction time was estimated in 2011 at five years and was completed and opened for traffic on September 10, 2015. The new highway features tolled express lanes, known as TEXpress lanes, in between the main lanes or underneath them. The cost to drive on them fluctuates based on the current flow of traffic at the time. The project is among several billion dollar plus projects in the planning phase in and around downtown Dallas along with the rebuild of the I-35E/I-30 "Mixmaster".

Exit list

See also

List of facilities named after Lyndon Johnson

References

External links

Interstate Guide: I-635 (Texas)
I-635 info page -- from dfwfreeways.info
Kurumi: 3-digit Interstates from I-35

35-6
35-6 Texas
6
Transportation in Dallas County, Texas
Transportation in Tarrant County, Texas